The North Branch Penobscot River is a river in Somerset County, Maine.

In 1939, the Great Northern Paper Company impounded Fifth St. John Pond in T.6 R.17 and dug a  canal from the pond allowing the diversion of water from the Saint John River's Baker Branch into the Penobscot's North Branch, to sluice wood to the company mill at Millinocket. Yellow perch also used the canal to spread into the upper Penobscot River drainage.

See also
List of rivers of Maine

References

Maine Streamflow Data from the USGS
Maine Watershed Data From Environmental Protection Agency

Tributaries of the Penobscot River
Rivers of Somerset County, Maine
Rivers of Maine